Pécsi Mecsek Football Club, commonly referred to as Pécsi MFC or simply PMFC, is a professional Hungarian football club based in Pécs, Baranya, that currently competes in the Hungarian second division. The club was established on 16 February 1973 by the merger of five other clubs of the city, Pécsi Dózsa, Pécsi Ércbányász SC, Pécsi Helyiipari SK, Pécsi Bányász and Pécsi Építők.

Pécsi MFC's home ground is the Stadium of PMFC, also known as Stadium of Újmecsekalja, a football stadium in Uránváros. The stadium's current capacity is 7,000, it was opened in 1955.

Pécsi MFC holds long-standing rivalries with other football clubs, most notably Komlói Bányász SK, a club based in Komló, a city near Pécs, and Kaposvári Rákóczi FC from Kaposvár.

Since its foundation in 1973, the club played most of their seasons in the first division, with twelve seasons spent in the second division. After finishing on the first place of the Western Group of the second division in 2011, the club was promoted to the highest level of professional league.

Despite finishing 11th in the 2014–15 season, the club lost its professional licence due to financial difficulties and gained admittance to the fourth tier of the Hungarian league system in time for the start of the following season. The relegation saw owner Dezső Matyi leaving the club after 8 years, when he sold his share to the city of Pécs.

Pécsi are best known for becoming the first European opponents of Universitatea Craiova when they played against the White-Blues in the 1970–71 Fairs Cup.

History

Early years (1950–1972)

Although association football had been present in Pécs since the early 20th century, the predecessor of Pécsi MFC was founded later, in 1950 with the name Pécsi Dózsa. The new club started to compete in the third division and eventually won promotion to the second division in 1953. After spending only two years in the NB II with moderate success, Pécsi Dózsa started the 1950 season in the top flight of the Hungarian football pyramid, after a fusion with Budapest-based club Kőbányai Dózsa.  Pécsi Dózsa made its debut in the first division on 27 February 1955, with a 3–0 win against Szombathely.
With only one year of hiatus, Pécsi Dózsa was a member of the NB I until 1972, when the club underwent another, more complex fusion with four other local clubs.

From Pécsi Dózsa to Pécsi MSC

Pécs played in second division in the season of 1975–76. Pécs finished as champions of the second division in the season of 1976–77. PMSC has been playing in the first division for 20 years between 1977 and 1997. They won the Hungarian Cup in 1990.

In the then European Cup Winners Cup they were drawn against Manchester United, and became the first team to play against English opposition in Europe since English teams were banned five years previously. They lost the game 3–0 on aggregate, and Manchester United went on to win the competition, beating Barcelona in the final.

In 2003 Pécs rejoined the first division after two years of exile. Pécs drew with Szombathelyi Haladás and finished first eleven points clear. Tamás Nagy's team lost only three times in 34 matches.

The club won the 2019–20 Nemzeti Bajnokság III season which was interrupted and finally terminated in May 2020 due to the COVID-19 pandemic. Pécs was eligible to play in the 2020-21 Nemzeti Bajnokság II.

Current squad

Out on loan

Stadium

Stadion PMFC is a UEFA Category 1 football stadium in Pécs, Hungary.  It is currently used for football matches and is the home stadium of Pécsi MFC.  The stadium is able to hold 7,000 people and was opened in 1955.
The stadium used to be referred to as "PMSC stadion" due to the old name of the local team, and sometimes referred to as "Újmecsekaljai stadion", which is derived from the name of the district, where the stadium is located.

Name changes
1950: Dózsa (Pécsi Dózsa Sport Club)
1973: PMSC (Pécsi Munkás Sport Club) amalgamation with Pécsi Bányász SC (founded in 1921 as DVAC), Pécsi Ércbányász SC (founded in 1957), Pécsi Helyiipar SK (founded in 1957) and Pécsi Építők (founded in 1949)
1995: PMFC (Pécsi Mecsek Futball Club)

Season results

Managers

 Gyula Bodola (1953–54)
 István Orczifalvy (1955–56)
 Dr. Géza Kalocsay (1956)
 Béla Volentik (1957–58)
 Mihály Czibulka (1958–61)
 Lipót Kállay (1961–63)
 Sándor II. Balogh (1963–64)
 István Orczifalvy (1964–66)
 Gyula Teleki (1966–68)
 Imre Kovács (1968–70)
 Sándor Kapocsi (1970)
 Mihály Czibulka (1970–71)
 Kálmán Preiner (1971–72)
 Mihály Czibulka (1973)
 János Dunai (1973–??)
 István Rónai (1983–85)
 József Garami (1 July 1985–92)
 Nándor Koller (1992–93)
 Antal Róth (1993–94)
 László Eich
 Pál Dárdai (199?–96)
 Imre Herke (1996)
 József Gelei (1996–97)
 László Kiss (1997)
 Róbert Glázer (1997–98)
 Gábor Réfi (1998)
 Gyula Bozai (1999–00)
 Gábor Szapor (2000)
 Árpád Toma (2000)
 Antal Róth (2001–02)
 Tamás Nagy (1 July 2003 – 24 April 2005)
 Ferenc Keszei (10 June 2005 – 22 May 2007)
 Károly Kis (15 June 2007 – Sept 18, 2007)
 Tamás Nagy (Sept 20, 2007–25 Aug 2008)
 Antal Róth (26 Aug 2008 – 4 May 2009)
 Antal Botos (5 May 2009 – 2 Nov 2009)
 Péter Várhidi (18 Nov 2009 – 13 June 2010)
 László Kiss (15 June 2010 – 14 March 2011)
 Ferenc Mészáros (15 March 2011 – 2 April 2012)
 Olivér Mink (4 April 2012 – 1 June 2012)
 Attila Supka (1 July 2012 – 5 Jan 2013)
 Emil Lőrincz and G. Márton (5 Jan 2013 – 30 June 2013)
 György Véber (16 June 2014–November, 2014)
 Robert Jarni (November, 2014– July 2015)
 Gábor Márton (Aug 2015– July 2018)
 György Sárai (Aug 2018– October 2018)
 László Vas (March 2019 –)

Honours
 Hungarian League:
 2nd (1): 1985–86
 3rd (1): 1990–91
 Hungarian Second Division:
 Winners (4): 1958–59, 1976–77, 2002–03, 2010–11
 Hungarian Cup:
 Winners (1): 1989–90
 Runners-up (2): 1977–78, 1986–87

European cup history

UEFA Cup Winners' Cup

UEFA Intertoto Cup

UEFA Cup

See also

Other clubs from Pécs
Pécsi Vasutas SK
Pécs-Baranya FC

References

External links
Official website
Detailed international matches list

 
Football clubs in Hungary
Association football clubs established in 1950
1950 establishments in Hungary
Mining association football clubs in Hungary